Myung Film Co., Ltd. (Hangul: 명필름) is a South Korean film production and distribution company. Established in the Republic of Korea by Shim Jae-myung, the company has distributed films throughout South Korea since its founding in September 1995.

The institute's first feature film In Between Seasons (2016) was directed by first-time director Lee Dong-eun who graduated from its first Film Directing major graduating class. In Between Seasons was screened in the New Currents section at the 21st Busan International Film Festival where it won the KNN Award. Lee went on to make his second feature, the critically acclaimed Mothers (2017) which won the NETPAC Award at the 2018 Vesoul International Film Festival of Asian Cinema.

Releases

References

External links 
 

Film distributors of South Korea
Film production companies of South Korea
Mass media companies established in 1995
Companies based in Seoul
South Korean companies established in 1995